Ludovic Radosavljevic (born 17 August 1989) is a French rugby union player. His position is Scrum-half and he plays for Pro D2 club Provence. He began his career with Pays d'Aix RC, now known as Provence Rugby, in the third-tier Fédérale 1 before moving to Clermont Auvergne in 2008 and then Castres in 2017. He eventually returned to his first club Provence in 2020. On 03 November 2021, he was made redundant by his club after having been found guilty of racially abusing a black player, calling him "banana eater".

Personal life
Rasodavljevic was born in France and is of Serbian descent.

Honours

Club 
 Castres
Top 14: 2017–18

References

1989 births
Living people
French rugby union players
French people of Serbian descent
Sportspeople from Avignon
ASM Clermont Auvergne players
Provence Rugby players
Rugby union scrum-halves
Castres Olympique players